This is a listing of the horses that finished in either first, second, or third place and the number of starters in the Fountain of Youth Stakes, an American Grade 2 race for three-year-olds at 1-1/8 miles on dirt held at Gulfstream Park in
Hallandale Beach, Florida.  (List 1973-present)

A # designates that the race was run in two divisions in 1993, 1986 and 1983.
A * designates the horse was official winner due to a DQ of apparent winner.

References

External links
 The Fountain of Youth Stakes at the NTRA
 The Fountain of Youth Stakes at Pedigree Query

Gulfstream Park
Lists of horse racing results